Miguel Cullen is a British poet and journalist who lives in London.

Background
Cullen's poetry derives from his mixed South American and British heritage. He spent long periods immersed in rave culture, particularly Oldschool jungle. When he lived in Bristol he would MC to Drum and bass and Reggae, and become friends with Roni Size labelmate MC Tali. 
He would frequently return to Argentina, on trips to document Cumbia Villera and other subgenres.

Poetry
Cullen's first collection of poetry, Wave Caps, was a The Times Literary Supplement ‘Book of the Year’ in 2014. The TLS praised its “streetsmart ventriloquism”, while an interview in Vice (magazine) described it as “full of the lawless energy of late nights and early mornings, hop-scotching London’s jungle raves”.

Cullen's second collection, Paranoid Narcissism! was released in 2017. It was a London Evening Standard Book of the Year 2017. The historian A.N. Wilson said of it: “Each of these subtly-crafted poems contains a surprise; each is a distinct work of art, with the power to shake, move, change us". Poet Steven J Fowler said of it: "Lyrical, voluminously expressive, beautiful in their knotted, winding intensity – Miguel Cullen's poems are intricate, funny for everyone but you, unpleasantly bright and brilliant."

Cullen's poetry has been described as imagistic, inflected with urban vernacular, and preoccupied with iconic film and urban music references to create a delicate, interconnected world. The critic Ian Thomson (writer) compared him to Ezra Pound, citing his "allusions from Greek mythology (colliding) with sound system culture (and) pavement pounding street demotic". The poet Simon Barraclough
 compared his imagistic style to that of director Gaspar Noé.

Alteria Art, publishers of Paranoid Narcissism! also published the Artists' Book of ABCs, a book featuring the work of Grayson Perry, Joseph Kosuth, Tracey Emin and Jake and Dinos Chapman.

Journalism
Cullen is arts editor for The Catholic Herald. He has also published music and art journalism in Vice (magazine), Wonderland magazine, The Independent, The Daily Telegraph, and The Quietus,; including four cover features and in-depth documentary articles on Dub music, the Bristol underground scene, and the history of Black cinema in the UK for Clash (magazine),

Cullen has also written one of the only formal literary interviews with American Modernist poet Frederick Seidel

References

External links
 journalisted.com profile
 Vice interview

Living people
Year of birth missing (living people)
Journalists from London
British poets